The following is the complete discography of the British rock band Asking Alexandria. Their releases have so far consisted of seven full-length studio albums, three EPs, one live album, one remix album, 38 singles, 26 music videos and four other appearances.

Albums

Studio albums

Live albums

Remix albums

Extended plays

Singles

As featured artist

Music videos

Other appearances

Notes

References

External links
Spirit-of-metal.com

Heavy metal group discographies
Discographies of British artists